Kenneth Leroy Brondell (October 17, 1921 – October 3, 2004) was a Major League Baseball pitcher who had seven appearances for the New York Giants, all in 1944. After his short MLB career, Brondell joined the Los Angeles Police Department (LAPD) in 1945. 
He retired in 1975 after 30 years at the rank of Detective. 

Brondell's only decision came in his final game, on October 1, 1944, when he gave up 10 runs to the St. Louis Cardinals. Nick Strincevich is the only batter struck out by Brondell.

References

External links

1921 births
2004 deaths
Major League Baseball pitchers
Baseball players from Nebraska
People from York County, Nebraska
New York Giants (NL) players